The Longsheng Rice Terraces ("Dragon's Victory"), also called the Longji Rice Terraces  ("Dragon's Backbone"), are located in the town of Longji in Longsheng Various Nationalities Autonomous County, about  from Guilin, China.

A coiling terrace line that starts from the mountain foot up to the mountain top divides the mountain into layers of water in spring, layers of green rice shoots in summer, layers of rice in fall, and layers of frost in winter. The terraced fields were mostly built about 650 years ago.

Longji (Dragon's Backbone) Terraced Rice Fields received their name because the rice terraces resemble a dragon's scales, while the summit of the mountain range looks like the backbone of the dragon.

In early June, water is pumped over the rice paddies, and young plants are transferred to the main terraces.

Gallery

References

External links 
 
 

Geography of Guilin
Tourist attractions in Guilin
Agricultural terraces
Longsheng Various Nationalities Autonomous County